The Atchison, Topeka and Santa Fe Railway , often referred to as the Santa Fe or AT&SF, was one of the larger railroads in the United States. The railroad was chartered in February 1859 to serve the cities of Atchison and Topeka, Kansas, and Santa Fe, New Mexico. The railroad reached the Kansas–Colorado border in 1873 and Pueblo, Colorado, in 1876. To create a demand for its services, the railroad set up real estate offices and sold farmland from the land grants that it was awarded by Congress.

Despite being chartered to serve the city, the railroad chose to bypass Santa Fe, due to the engineering challenges of the mountainous terrain. Eventually a branch line from Lamy, New Mexico, brought the Santa Fe railroad to its namesake city.

The Santa Fe was a pioneer in intermodal freight transport; at various times, it operated an airline, the short-lived Santa Fe Skyway, and the fleet of Santa Fe Railroad Tugboats. Its bus line extended passenger transportation to areas not accessible by rail, and ferryboats on the San Francisco Bay allowed travelers to complete their westward journeys to the Pacific Ocean. The AT&SF was the subject of a popular song, Harry Warren and Johnny Mercer's "On the Atchison, Topeka and the Santa Fe", written for the film The Harvey Girls (1946).

The railroad officially ceased operations on December 31, 1996, when it merged with the Burlington Northern Railroad to form the Burlington Northern and Santa Fe Railway.

History

Atchison, Topeka & Santa Fe Railway

Expansion

On , the railway was one of many companies that sponsored attractions in Disneyland with its five-year sponsorship of all Disneyland trains and stations until 1974.

In 1960, AT&SF bought the Toledo, Peoria & Western Railroad (TP&W); then sold a half-interest to the Pennsylvania Railroad (PRR). The TP&W cut straight east across Illinois from near Fort Madison, Iowa (Lomax, IL), to a connection with the PRR at Effner, Indiana (Illinois–Indiana border), forming a bypass around Chicago for traffic moving between the two lines. The TP&W route did not mesh with the traffic patterns Conrail developed after 1976, so AT&SF bought back the other half, merged the TP&W in 1983, then sold it back into independence in 1989.

Attempted Southern Pacific merger

AT&SF began to talk mergers in the 1980s. The Southern Pacific Santa Fe Railroad (SPSF) was a proposed merger between the parent companies of the Southern Pacific and AT&SF announced on December 23, 1983. As part of the joining of the two firms, all rail and non-rail assets owned by Santa Fe Industries and the Southern Pacific Transportation Company were placed under the control of a holding company, the Santa Fe–Southern Pacific Corporation. The merger was subsequently denied by the Interstate Commerce Commission (ICC) on the basis that it would create too many duplicate routes.

The companies were so confident the merger would be approved that they began repainting locomotives and non-revenue rolling stock in a new unified paint scheme. While Southern Pacific (railroad) was sold off to Rio Grande Industries, all of the SP's real estate holdings were consolidated into a new company, Catellus Development Corporation, making it California's largest private landowner, of which Santa Fe remained the owner. In the early 1980s, gold was discovered on several properties west of Battle Mountain, Nevada along I-80, on ground owned by the Santa Fe Railroad (formerly SP). The Santa Fe Pacific Corporation (a name correlation of Santa Fe and Southern Pacific) was to develop the properties. They were sold to Newmont during 1997 in preparation for the merger with Burlington Northern). Sometime later, Catellus would purchase the Union Pacific Railroad's interest in the Los Angeles Union Passenger Terminal (LAUPT).

Burlington Northern merger

On September 22, 1995, AT&SF merged with Burlington Northern Railroad to form the Burlington Northern & Santa Fe Railway (BNSF). Some of the challenges resulting from the joining of the two companies included the establishment of a common dispatching system, the unionization of AT&SF's non-union dispatchers, and incorporating AT&SF's train identification codes throughout. The two lines maintained separate operations until December 31, 1996, when it officially became BNSF.

Source: Santa Fe Railroad (1945), Along Your Way, Rand McNally, Chicago, Illinois.

Company officers

Passenger service

AT&SF was widely known for its passenger train service in the first half of the 20th century. AT&SF introduced many innovations in passenger rail travel, among these the "Pleasure Domes" of the Super Chief (billed as the "...only dome car[s] between Chicago and Los Angeles" when they were introduced in 1951) and the "Big Dome" Lounge cars and double-decker Hi-Level cars of the El Capitan, which entered revenue service in 1954. The railroad was among the first to add dining cars to its passenger trains, a move which began in 1891, following the examples of the Northern Pacific and Union Pacific railroads. The AT&SF offered food on board in a dining car or at one of the many Harvey House restaurants that were strategically located throughout the system.

In general, the same train name was used for both directions of a particular train. The exceptions to this rule included the Chicagoan and Kansas Cityan trains (both names referred to the same service, but the Chicagoan was the eastbound version, while the Kansas Cityan was the westbound version), and the Eastern Express and West Texas Express. All AT&SF trains that terminated in Chicago did so at Dearborn Station. Trains terminating in Los Angeles arrived at AT&SF's La Grande Station until May 1939, when Los Angeles Union Passenger Terminal was opened.

The Santa Fe was the only railroad to run trains from Chicago to California on its own tracks.  The railway's extensive network was also home to a number of regional services. These generally couldn't boast of the size or panache of the transcontinental trains, but built up enviable reputations of their own nonetheless. Of these, the Chicago-Texas trains were the most famous and impressive. The San Diegans, which ran from Los Angeles to San Diego, were the most popular and durable, becoming to the Santa Fe what New York City-Philadelphia trains were to the Pennsylvania Railroad. But Santa Fe flyers also served Tulsa, Oklahoma, El Paso, Texas, Phoenix, Arizona (the Hassayampa Flyer), and Denver, Colorado, among other cities not on their main line.

To reach smaller communities, the railroad operated mixed (passenger and freight) trains or gas-electric doodlebug rail cars. The latter were later converted to diesel power, and one pair of Budd Rail Diesel Cars was eventually added. After World War II, Santa Fe Trailways buses replaced most of these lesser trains. These smaller trains generally were not named; only the train numbers were used to differentiate services.

The ubiquitous passenger service inspired the title of the 1946 Academy-Award-winning Harry Warren tune "On the Atchison, Topeka and the Santa Fe." The song was written in 1945 for the film The Harvey Girls, a story about the waitresses of the Fred Harvey Company's restaurants. It was sung in the film by Judy Garland and recorded by many other singers, including Bing Crosby. In the 1970s, the railroad used Crosby's version in a commercial.

AT&SF ceased operating passenger trains on May 1, 1971, when it conveyed its remaining trains to Amtrak. These included the Super Chief / El Capitan, the Texas Chief and the San Diegan (though Amtrak reduced the San Diegan from three round trips to two). Discontinued were the San Francisco Chief, the ex-Grand Canyon, the Tulsan, and a Denver–La Junta local. ATSF had been more than willing to retain the San Diegan and its famed Chiefs. However, any railroad that opted out of Amtrak would have been required to operate all of its passenger routes until at least 1976. The prospect of having to keep operating its less-successful routes, especially the money-bleeding 23/24 (the former Grand Canyon) led ATSF to get out of passenger service altogether.

Amtrak still runs the Super Chief and San Diegan today as the Southwest Chief and Pacific Surfliner, respectively, although the original routes and equipment have been modified by Amtrak.

Named trains

AT&SF operated the following named trains on regular schedules:
 The Angel: San Francisco, California – Los Angeles, California – San Diego, California (this was the southbound version of the Saint)
 The Angelo: San Angelo, Texas – Fort Worth, Texas (on the GC&SF)
 The Antelope: Oklahoma City, Oklahoma – Kansas City, Missouri
 Atlantic Express: Los Angeles, California – Kansas City, Missouri (this was the eastbound version of the Los Angeles Express).
 California Express: Chicago, Illinois – Kansas City, Missouri – Los Angeles, California
 California Fast Mail: Chicago, Illinois – Los Angeles, California – San Francisco, California
 California Limited: Chicago, Illinois – Los Angeles, California
 California Special: Clovis, New Mexico – Houston, Texas (with through connections to California via the San Francisco Chief at Clovis)
 Cavern: Clovis, New Mexico – Carlsbad, New Mexico (connected with the Scout).
 Centennial State: Denver, Colorado – Chicago, Illinois
 Central Texas Express: Sweetwater, Texas – Lubbock, Texas
 Chicagoan: Kansas City, Missouri – Chicago, Illinois (this was the eastbound version of the Kansas Cityan passenger train).
 Chicago Express: Newton, Kansas – Chicago, Illinois
 Chicago Fast Mail: San Francisco, California – Los Angeles, California – Chicago, Illinois
 Chicago-Kansas City Flyer: Chicago, Illinois – Kansas City, Missouri
 The Chief: Chicago, Illinois – Los Angeles, California
 Eastern Express: Lubbock, Texas – Amarillo, Texas (this was the eastbound version of the West Texas Express).
 El Capitan: Chicago, Illinois – Los Angeles, California
 El Pasoan: El Paso, Texas – Albuquerque, New Mexico
 El Tovar: Los Angeles, California – Chicago, Illinois (via Belen)
 Fargo Fast Mail/Express: Belen, New Mexico – Amarillo, Texas – Kansas City, Missouri – Chicago, Illinois
 Fast Fifteen: Newton, Kansas – Galveston, Texas
 Fast Mail Express: San Francisco, California (via Los Angeles) – Chicago, Illinois
 Golden Gate: Oakland, California – Bakersfield, California, with coordinated connecting bus service to Los Angeles and San Francisco
 Grand Canyon Limited: Chicago, Illinois – Los Angeles, California
 Hassayampa Flyer: Phoenix, Arizona – Ash Fork, Arizona (later Williams Junction, Arizona)
 The Hopi: Los Angeles, California – Chicago, Illinois
 Kansas Cityan: Chicago, Illinois – Kansas City, Missouri (this was the westbound version of the Chicagoan passenger train).
 Kansas City Chief: Kansas City, Missouri – Chicago, Illinois
 Los Angeles Express: Chicago, Illinois – Los Angeles, California (this was the westbound version of the Atlantic Express).
 The Missionary: San Francisco, California – Belen, New Mexico – Amarillo, Texas – Kansas City, Missouri – Chicago, Illinois
 Navajo: Chicago, Illinois – San Francisco, California (via Los Angeles)
 Oil Flyer: Kansas City, Missouri – Tulsa, Oklahoma, with through sleepers to Chicago via other trains
 Overland Limited: Chicago, Illinois – Los Angeles, California
 Phoenix Express: Los Angeles, California – Phoenix, Arizona
 The Ranger: Kansas City, Missouri – Chicago, Illinois
 The Saint: San Diego, California – Los Angeles, California – San Francisco, California (this was the northbound version of the "Angel")
 San Diegan: Los Angeles, California – San Diego, California
 San Francisco Chief: San Francisco, California – Chicago, Illinois
 San Francisco Express: Chicago, Illinois – San Francisco, California (via Los Angeles)
 Santa Fe de Luxe: Chicago, Illinois – Los Angeles, California – San Francisco, California
 Santa Fe Eight: Belen, New Mexico – Amarillo, Texas – Kansas City, Missouri – Chicago, Illinois
 The Scout: Chicago, Illinois – San Francisco, California (via Los Angeles)
 South Plains Express: Sweetwater, Texas – Lubbock, Texas
 Super Chief: Chicago, Illinois – Los Angeles, California
 The Texan: Houston, Texas – New Orleans, Louisiana (on the GC&SF between Galveston and Houston, then via the Missouri Pacific Railroad between Houston and New Orleans).
 Texas Chief: Galveston, Texas (on the GC&SF) – Chicago, Illinois
 Tourist Flyer: Chicago, Illinois – San Francisco, California (via Los Angeles)
 The Tulsan: Tulsa, Oklahoma – Kansas City, Mo. with through coaches to Chicago, Illinois, via other trains (initially the Chicagoan/Kansas Cityan)
 Valley Flyer: Oakland, California – Bakersfield, California
 West Texas Express: Amarillo, Texas – Lubbock, Texas (this was the westbound version of the Eastern Express).

Special trains

Occasionally, a special train was chartered to make a high-profile run over the Santa Fe's track. These specials were not included in the railroad's regular revenue service lineup, but were intended as one-time (and usually one-way) traversals of the railroad. Some of the more notable specials include:
 Cheney Special: Colton, California – Chicago, Illinois (a one-time train that ran in 1895 on behalf of B.P. Cheney, a director of the Santa Fe).
 Clarke Special: Winslow, Arizona – Chicago, Illinois (a one-time train that ran in 1904 on behalf of Charles W. Clarke, the son of then-Arizona senator William Andrew Clarke).
 David B. Jones Special: Los Angeles, California – Chicago, Illinois, and on to Lake Forest, Illinois (a one-time, record-breaking train that ran between May 5 to 8, 1923, on behalf of the president of the Mineral Point Zinc Company).
 Huntington Special: Argentine, Kansas – Chicago, Illinois (a one-time train that ran in 1899 on behalf of Collis P. Huntington).
 H.P. Lowe Special: Chicago, Illinois – Los Angeles, California (a one-time, record-breaking train that ran in 1903 on behalf of the president of the Engineering Company of America).
 Miss Nellie Bly Special: San Francisco, California – Chicago, Illinois (a one-time, record-breaking train that ran in 1890 on behalf of Nellie Bly, a reporter for the New York World newspaper).
 Peacock Special: Los Angeles, California – Chicago, Illinois (a one-time train that ran in 1900 on behalf of A.R. Peacock, vice-president of the Carnegie Steel and Iron Company).
 Scott Special: Los Angeles, California – Chicago, Illinois (the most well-known of Santa Fe's "specials," also known as the Coyote Special, the Death Valley Coyote, and the Death Valley Scotty Special: a one-time, record-breaking train that ran in 1905, essentially as a publicity stunt).

Signals

The Santa Fe employed several distinctive wayside and crossing signal styles.  In an effort to reduce grade crossing accidents, the Santa Fe was an early user of wigwag signals from the Magnetic Signal Company, beginning in the 1920s.  They had several distinct styles that were not commonly seen elsewhere.  Model 10's, which had the wigwag motor and banner coming from halfway up the mast with the crossbucks on top, were almost unique to the Santa Fe–the Southern Pacific had a few as well.  Upper quadrant Magnetic Flagmen were used extensively on the Santa Fe as well–virtually every small town main street and a number of city streets had their crossings protected by these unique wigwags.  Virtually all the wigwags were replaced with modern signals by the turn of the 21st century.

The railroad was also known for its tall "T-2 style" upper quadrant semaphores which provided traffic control on its lines.  Again, the vast majority of these had been replaced by the beginning of the 21st century, with fewer than 50 still remaining in use in New Mexico as of 2015.

Paint schemes

Steam locomotives

The Santa Fe operated a large and varied fleet of steam locomotives. In 1899, the company owned 1036 locomotives. Among them was the 2-10-2 "Santa Fe", originally built for the railroad by Baldwin Locomotive Works in 1903. The railroad would ultimately end up with the largest fleet of them, at over 300. Aside from the 2-10-2, Santa Fe rostered virtually every type of steam locomotive imaginable, including 4-4-2 Atlantics, 2-6-0 Moguls, 2-8-0 Consolidations, 2-8-2 Mikados, 2-10-0 Decapods, 2-6-2 Prairies, 4-8-4 Northerns, 4-6-4 Hudsons, 4-6-2 Pacifics, 4-8-2 Mountains, 2-8-4 Berkshires, and 2-10-4 Texas. The railroad also operated a fleet of heavy articulated steam locomotives, including 1158 class 2-6-6-2s, 2-8-8-0s, 2-10-10-2s, 2-8-8-2s, and the rare 4-4-6-2 Mallet type. The railroad retired its last steam locomotive in 1959.

During the twentieth century, all but one of these was painted black, with white unit numbers on the sand domes and three sides of the tender. Cab sides were lettered "AT&SF", also in white. The subsidiary Gulf, Colorado and Santa Fe often painted all or part of the smokebox (between the boiler and the headlight) white or silver. In 1940, the circle and cross emblem was applied to the tenders of a few passenger locomotives, but these were all later painted over. After World War II, "Santa Fe" appeared on tender sides of mainline road locomotives in white, above the unit number. Locomotives were delivered from Baldwin with white paint on the wheel rims, but the road did not repaint these "whitewalls" after shopping the locomotives. After World War II, side rods and valve gear were painted chrome yellow. For a short time, Pacific types 1369 and 1376 were semi-streamlined for "Valley Flyer" service, with a unique paint scheme in colors similar to those used on the new passenger diesels. More unique was the two-tone light blue over royal blue scheme of streamlined Hudson type 3460.

Preserved locomotives 

While most of the Santa Fe's steam locomotives were retired and sold for scrap, over fifty were saved and donated to various parks and museums, a handful of which have either been restored to operating condition or are pending future restoration.

Some of the more notable locomotives include:
 5 (0-4-0), located at the California State Railroad Museum in Sacramento, California.
 132 (2-8-0), Built by Baldwin in 1880 and located at the Kansas Museum of History in Topeka. Named for Cyrus K. Holliday. Was used often by the Santa Fe for promotions and special events until it was donated to the Kansas State Historical Society in 1977.  It is the second oldest locomotive from the Santa Fe that is preserved close to its original appearance.
 643 (2-8-0), Originally built by Hinkley Locomotive Works in 1879 as #73 with a 4-4-0 arrangement. The oldest preserved locomotive of the Santa Fe, although not as originally configured. It was converted by the railroad to a 2-8-0 configuration following an accident in 1897. It had several upgrades over the years while working on the Gulf Division. It was formerly located at the then-new Oklahoma State Fairgrounds, following its donation from the Santa Fe to the people of Oklahoma in 1953.  The locomotive was relocated again in 2015 to the Oklahoma Railway Museum in Oklahoma City, where it received a badly needed cleaning and thorough cosmetic restoration, and is currently on display. 
 769 (2-8-0), located at the Old Coal Mine Museum in Madrid, New Mexico. It is waiting to be moved to the Santa Fe Southern Railway in Santa Fe for future restoration to operating condition.
 870 (2-8-0), located at Heritage Park in Santa Fe Springs, California.
 940 (2-10-2), located at the Union depot in Bartlesville, Oklahoma. It is the only surviving steam locomotive from the Santa Fe with a 2-10-2 wheel arrangement.
 1010 (2-6-2), located at the California State Railroad Museum in Sacramento, California.
 1129 (2-6-2), located at Las Vegas, New Mexico.
 1316 (4-6-2), formerly located at Fort Concho, Texas: the sole survivor of the 1309 class was restored to operating condition by the Texas State Railroad in the early 1980s as its No. 500. It is currently displayed at Palestine for another restoration for future excursion service.
 2913 (4-8-4), located in Riverview Park at Fort Madison, Iowa.
 2926 (4-8-4), formerly located in Coronado Park in Albuquerque, New Mexico. This locomotive has been undergoing restoration for operational purposes by the New Mexico Steam Locomotive and Rail Historical Society, which has expended 114,000 man-hours and $1,700,000 in donated funds on her restoration since 2002. It has been operational since July 2021.
 3415 (4-6-2), formerly located at Eisenhower Park in Abilene, Kansas, until it was acquired by the Abilene and Smoky Valley Railroad and has been restored for excursion service since 2009.
 3416 (4-6-2), currently preserved at Great Bend, Kansas.
 3417 (4-6-2), formerly preserved at Hulen Park, in Cleburne, Texas.
 3423 (4-6-2), located at the Railroad & Heritage Museum in Temple Texas, it is currently preserved.
 3424 (4-6-2), Preserved in Kinsley, Kansas.
 3450 (4-6-4), the sole survivor of the 3450 class, this locomotive is the gateway of the RailGiants Train Museum in Pomona, California.
 3463 (4-6-4), the sole survivor of the 3460 class, this locomotive is located at the Kansas Expocentre in Topeka, Kansas, waiting for future restoration.
 3751 (4-8-4), the Santa Fe's and Baldwin's very first 4-8-4, was once on display at Viaduct Park near the AT&SF depot in San Bernardino, California. The locomotive was moved out of the park in 1986 to be restored and, after almost 5 years later, No. 3751 made its first run on a 4-day trip from Los Angeles to Bakersfield and return in December 1991. This trip marked the beginning of No. 3751's career in excursion service. Currently undergoing a federally required 15-year overhaul. In September of 2022, it's federally required 15-year overhaul was complete, and after that, it attended the Amtrak Track Safety Event in Fullerton, California on September 24, 2022 and September 25, 2022.
 3759 (4-8-4): This locomotive is known for pulling the "Farewell to Steam Excursion" for the Santa Fe in 1955 before it was donated to the City of Kingman, Arizona, where it is currently on static display. It was almost acquired by the Grand Canyon Railway in the early 1990s.
 3768 (4-8-4), after retiring in 1958, it was donated to the city of Wichita, Kansas, where it is currently preserved at the Great Plains Museum of Transportation.
 5000 Madame Queen (2-10-4), the second-oldest preserved steam locomotive with a 2-10-4 wheel arrangement, Madame Queen is located in Amarillo, Texas, awaiting possible relocation elsewhere.
 5011 (2-10-4), the first of the 5011 class, is on static display at the National Museum of Transportation in St. Louis, Missouri.
 5017 (2-10-4), located at the National Railroad Museum in Green Bay, Wisconsin.
 9005 (0-6-0), located in the historic train depot in Clovis, New Mexico.

Diesel locomotives

Passenger

Santa Fe's first set of diesel-electric passenger locomotives was placed in service on the Super Chief in 1936, and consisted of a pair of blunt-nosed units (EMC 1800 hp B-B) designated as Nos. 1 and 1A. The upper portion of the sides and ends of the units were painted gold, while the lower section was a dark olive green color; an olive stripe also ran along the sides and widened as it crossed the front of the locomotive.

Riveted to the sides of the units were metal plaques bearing a large "Indian Head" logo, which owed its origin to the 1926 Chief "drumhead" logo. "Super Chief" was emblazoned on a plaque located on the front. The rooftop was light slate gray, rimmed by a red pinstripe. This unique combination of colors was called the Golden Olive paint scheme. Before entering service, Sterling McDonald's General Motors Styling Department augmented the look with the addition of red and blue striping along both the sides and ends of the units in order to enhance their appearance.

In a little over a year, the EMC E1 (a new and improved streamlined locomotive) would be pulling the Super Chief and other passenger consists, resplendent in the now-famous Warbonnet paint scheme devised by Leland Knickerbocker of the GM Art and Color Section. Its design was protected under a U.S. design patent, granted on November 9, 1937. It is reminiscent of a Native American ceremonial head-dress. The scheme consisted of a red "bonnet" that wrapped around the front of the unit and was bordered by a yellow stripe and black pinstripe. The extent of the bonnet varied according to the locomotive model and was largely determined by the shape and length of the car body. The remainder of the unit was either painted silver or was composed of stainless-steel panels.

All units wore a nose emblem consisting of an elongated yellow "Circle and Cross" emblem with integral "tabs" on the nose and the sides, outlined and accented with black pinstripes, with variances according to the locomotive model. "SANTA FE" was displayed on the horizontal limb of the cross in black, Art Deco-style lettering. This emblem has come to be known as the "cigar band" due to its uncanny resemblance to the same. On all but the "Erie-built" units (which were essentially run as a demonstrator set), GE U28CG, GE U30CG, and FP45 units, a three-part yellow and black stripe ran up the nose behind the band.

A "Circle and Cross" motif (consisting of a yellow field, with red quadrants, outlined in black) was painted around the side windows on "as-delivered" E1 units. Similar designs were added to E3s, E6s, the DL109/110 locomotive set, and ATSF 1A after it was rebuilt and repainted. The sides of the units typically bore the words "SANTA FE" in black, 5"– or 9"–high extra extended Railroad Roman letters, as well as the "Indian Head" logo, with a few notable exceptions.

Railway identity on diesel locomotives in passenger service:

Source: Pelouze, Richard W. (1997). Trademarks of the Santa Fe Railway. The Santa Fe Railway Historical and Modeling Society, Inc., Highlands Ranch, Colorado, pp. 47–50.

In later years, Santa Fe adapted the scheme to its gas-electric "doodlebug" units. The standard for all of Santa Fe's passenger locomotives, the Warbonnet is considered by many to be the most-recognized corporate logo in the railroad industry. Early after Amtrak's inception in 1971, Santa Fe embarked on a program to repaint the red bonnet on its F units that were still engaged in hauling passenger consists with yellow (also called Yellowbonnets) or dark blue (nicknamed Bluebonnets), as it no longer wanted to project the image of a passenger carrier.

Freight

Diesels used as switchers between 1935 and 1960 were painted black, with just a thin white or silver horizontal accent stripe (the sills were painted similarly). The letters "A.T.& S.F." were applied in a small font centered on the sides of the unit, as was the standard blue and white "Santa Fe" box logo. After World War II, diagonal white or silver stripes were added to the ends and cab sides to increase the visibility at grade crossings (typically referred to as the Zebra Stripe scheme). "A.T.& S.F." was now placed along the sides of the unit just above the accent stripe, with the blue and white "Santa Fe" box logo below.

Due to the lack of abundant water sources in the American desert, the Santa Fe Railway was among the first railroads to receive large numbers of streamlined diesel locomotives for use in freight service, in the form of the EMD FT. For the first group of FTs, delivered between December 1940 and March 1943 (#100–#119), the railroad selected a color scheme consisting of dark blue accented by a pale yellow stripe up the nose, and pale yellow highlights around the cab and along the mesh and framing of openings in the sides of the engine compartment; a thin red stripe separated the blue areas from the yellow.

The words SANTA FE were applied in yellow in a 5"–high extended font, and centered on the nose was the "Santa Fe" box logo (initially consisting of a blue cross, circle, and square painted on a solid bronze sheet, but subsequently changed to baked steel sheets painted bronze with the blue identifying elements applied on top). Three thin, pale yellow stripes (known as Cat Whiskers) extended from the nose logo around the cab sides. In January, 1951, Santa Fe revised the scheme to consist of three yellow stripes running up the nose, with the addition of a blue and yellow Cigar Band (similar in size and shape to that applied to passenger units); the blue background and elongated yellow "SANTA FE" lettering were retained.

The years 1960 to 1972 saw non-streamlined freight locomotives sporting the "Billboard" color scheme (sometimes referred to as the "Bookends" or "Pinstripe" scheme), where the units were predominantly dark blue with yellow ends and trim, with a single yellow accent pinstripe. The words "Santa Fe" were applied in yellow in large bold serif letters (logotype) to the sides of the locomotive below the accent stripe (save for yard switchers which displayed the "SANTA FE" in small yellow letters above the accent stripe, somewhat akin to the Zebra Stripe arrangement).

From 1972 to 1996, and even on into the BNSF era, the company adopted a new paint scheme often known among railfans as the "Freightbonnet", which placed more yellow on the locomotives (reminiscent of the company's retired Warbonnet scheme); the goal again was to ensure higher visibility at grade crossings. The truck assemblies, previously colored black, now received silver paint.

In 1965, the road took delivery of ten GE U28CG dual-service road switcher locomotives equally suited to passenger or fast freight service. These wore a variation of the "Warbonnet" scheme in which the black and yellow separating stripes disappeared. The "Santa Fe" name was emblazoned on the sides in large black letters, using the same stencils used on freight engines; these were soon repainted in red. In 1989, Santa Fe resurrected this version of the "Warbonnet" scheme and applied it to two SDFP45 units, #5992 and #5998. The units were re-designated as #101 and #102 and reentered service on July 4, 1989, as part of the new "Super Fleet" campaign (the first Santa Fe units to be so decorated for freight service). The six remaining FP45 units were thereafter similarly repainted and renumbered. From that point forward, most new locomotives wore red and silver, and many retained this scheme after the Burlington Northern Santa Fe merger, some with "BNSF" displayed across their sides.

For the initial deliveries of factory-new "Super Fleet" equipment, Santa Fe took delivery of the EMD GP60M and General Electric B40-8W which made the Santa Fe the only US Class I railroad to operate new 4-axle (B-B) freight locomotives equipped with the North American Safety Cab intended for high-speed intermodal service.

Several experimental and commemorative paint schemes emerged during the Santa Fe's diesel era. One combination was developed and partially implemented in anticipation of a merger between the parent companies of the Santa Fe and Southern Pacific (SP) railroads in 1984. The red, yellow, and black paint scheme with large yellow block letters on the sides and ends of the units of the proposed Southern Pacific Santa Fe Railroad (SPSF) has come to be somewhat derisively known among railfans as the Kodachrome livery, due to the similarity in colors to the boxes containing slide film sold by the Eastman Kodak Company under the same name. Santa Fe units repainted in this scheme were labeled "SF", Southern Pacific units "SP", and some (presumably new) units wore the letters "SPSF". After the ICC's denial of the merger, railfans joked that SPSF really stood for "Shouldn't Paint So Fast."

Ferry service

Santa Fe maintained and operated a fleet of three passenger ferry boats (the San Pablo, the San Pedro, and the Ocean Wave) that connected Richmond, California, with San Francisco by water. The ships traveled the eight miles between the San Francisco Ferry Terminal and the railroad's Point Richmond terminal across San Francisco Bay. The service was originally established as a continuation of the company's named passenger train runs such as the Angel and the Saint. The larger two ships (the San Pablo and the San Pedro) carried Fred Harvey Company dining facilities.

Rival SP owned the world's largest ferry fleet (which was subsidized by other railroad activities), at its peak carrying 40 million passengers and 60 million vehicles annually aboard 43 vessels. Santa Fe discontinued ferry service in 1933 due to the effects of the Great Depression and routed their trains to Southern Pacific's ferry terminal in Oakland. The San Francisco–Oakland Bay Bridge opened in 1936, initiating a slow decline in demand for SP's ferry service, which was eventually discontinued circa 1958; starting in 1938, SF-bound passengers could board buses across the bridge at the Santa Fe Oakland depot (located in Emeryville).

See also

 ATSF 3460 class
 Beep (locomotive)
 CF7
 Corwith Yards, Chicago
 EMD F45
 EMD SDF40-2
 Christine Gonzalez
 David L. Gunn
 History of rail transportation in California
 List of defunct railroads of North America
 Santa Fe 3415 – a restored Pacific type steam locomotive
 Santa Fe 5000
 Santa Fe Refrigerator Despatch
 Santa Fe–Southern Pacific merger
 SD26
 Super C
 There Goes a Train

References

Further reading
 
 
 The Cosmopolitan (February 1893), The Atchison Topeka and Santa Fe. Retrieved May 10, 2005.
 
 
 
 
 
 
 Duke, Donald. Fred Harvey, civilizer of the American Southwest (Pregel Press, 1995); The passenger trains stopped for meals at Fred Harvey restaurants.
 Dye, Victoria E. All Aboard for Santa Fe: Railway Promotion of the Southwest, 1890s to 1930s (University of New Mexico Press, 2007).
 
 Frailey, Fred W. (1998). Twilight of the Great Trains, p. 108.  Waukesha, Wisconsin:  Kalmbach Publishing.  .
 Richard H. Frost, The Railroad and the Pueblo Indians: The Impact of the Atchison, Topeka and Santa fe on the Pueblos of the Rio Grande, 1880–1930. 2016, Salt Lake City: University of Utah Press. 
 
 Goen, Steve Allen (2000). Santa Fe in the Lone Star State
 
 Marshall, James Leslie. Santa Fe: the railroad that built an empire (1945).
 
 
 Pratt School of Engineering, Duke University (2004), Alumni Profiles: W. John Swartz. Retrieved May 11, 2005.
 Santa Fe Railroad (1945), Along Your Way, Rand McNally, Chicago.
 Santa Fe Railroad (November 29, 1942), Atchison, Topeka and Santa Fe Railway System Time Tables, Rand McNally and Company, Chicago.
 
 Solomon, Brian. Santa Fe Railway (Voyageur Press, 2003).
 
 Snell, Joseph W. and Don W. Wilson, "The Birth of the Atchison, Topeka and Santa Fe Railroad," (Part One) Kansas Historical Quarterly (1968) 34#2 pp 113–142. online
 Snell, Joseph W. and Don W. Wilson, "The Birth of the Atchison, Topeka and Santa Fe Railroad," (Part Two) Kansas Historical Quarterly (1968) 34#3 pp 325–356 online

External links

 "Along Your Way", 1946 edition
 Atchison, Topeka, and Santa Fe photos and other documents on Kansas Memory, the digital portal of the Kansas Historical Society (over 2800 AT&SF items)
 Atchison, Topeka, and Santa Fe Company Records at the Kansas Historical Society, Topeka, Kansas
 Russell Crump's Santa Fe Archives – a very extensive set of resources for Santa Fe history.
 Santa Fe All-Time Steam Roster
 Santa Fe Preserved Locomotives
 Santa Fe Preserved Passenger Cars
 Santa Fe Railway Historical and Modeling Society official website
 "Diesel Locomotives" article from the May 18, 1947, issue of Life Magazine featuring the Santa Fe fleet.
 James William Steele. Rand, McNally & Co.'s new overland guide to the Pacific Coast. Chicago: Rand, McNally & Co., 1888. Illustrated guide to the Santa Fe trip circa 1888.
 Encyclopedia of Oklahoma History and Culture – Atchison, Topeka, and Santa Fe Railway
 Atchison, Topeka and Santa Fe Railroad Records at Baker Library Historical Collections, Harvard Business School
 Oklahoma Digital Maps: Digital Collections of Oklahoma and Indian Territory
 Atchison Topeka & Santa Fe (ATSF) All-Time Diesel Roster

 
Former Class I railroads in the United States
Predecessors of the BNSF Railway
Rail lines receiving land grants
Railway companies established in 1895
Railway companies disestablished in 1996
Companies based in Chicago
Economy of the Southwestern United States
Defunct Arizona railroads
Defunct California railroads
Defunct Colorado railroads
Defunct Illinois railroads
Defunct Indiana railroads
Defunct Iowa railroads
Defunct Kansas railroads
Defunct Louisiana railroads
Defunct Missouri railroads
Defunct Nebraska railroads
Defunct Nevada railroads
Defunct New Mexico railroads
Defunct Oklahoma railroads
Defunct Texas railroads
Railroads in the Chicago metropolitan area
History of Chicago
History of San Diego
Superfund sites in New Mexico
American companies established in 1859
1996 disestablishments in Illinois